was a Japanese philosopher, revolutionary, writer, and Yoriki of the  in Osaka. Despite working for the government, he was openly against the Tokugawa regime. He is known for his role as leader in the rebellion against the Tokugawa shogunate.

Early life 
Ōshio was born as the eldest son in a samurai family in 1793. At the age of 15 he discovered he had a shameful ancestor who spent his days writing documents in the company of prisoners and municipals. This finding was the immediate cause of his decision to become a disciple of Neo-Confucianism. At the age of 24 he read a book about the morals and precepts of Chinese philosopher Lü Kun (1536-1618) and he then became inspired by Lü Kun's master: Wang Yangming.

Career 
From the age of 13, Ōshio was employed as a Yoriki. Additionally, he was a police inspector in Ōsaka. He proved his integrity by never accepting bribes and to oppose corruption. After 14 years he discovered that the new court official was a corrupt man which led to his resignation in 1830. Henceforth he began a pilgrimage to a place called Ōmi which led to his spiritual awakening.

When he returned to Ōsaka, he began writing and teaching about the Yōmeigaku and founded his own private school called the Senshindō (洗心洞). Ōshio spent the rest of his retirement teaching his students. Later on he published a book called Senshindō Sakki (洗心洞箚記), a compilation of scripts used in his lectures.

Philosophy 
Ōshio built upon the teachings of confucianism and the interpretation that learning innate knowledge could lead to inner peace, wisdom and the transcendence of life and death. His metaphysics was based on Wang Yangming's theory about Taikyō (absolute spirit) and Makoto (sincerity).

Taikyō (胎教) 
Taikyō is the fundamental creative power and the source of everything in the universe. One must turn to the absolute spirit if one wants to overcome the false, conventional categories of distinction. The re-identification with this absolute spirit makes life easier. One should adopt an attitude of true nature, sincere acts and an indifference to the concept of death.

Makoto (誠) 
Sincerity (Makoto, 誠) is known in Buddhism for acting according to distinct rules and standards. Ōshio adopted the idea of sincerity from Chinese philosopher Wang Yangming and gave the idea a unique Japanese interpretation. One must act as a brave samurai who knows no fear of death. This inner quality is known as sincerity. It also reflects the course of action Ōshio took during the rebellion.

The rebellion

Cause 

The shogunate of the Edo-period, founded and influenced by the Tokugawa family since 
the Battle of Sekigahara in 1600, was, next to climate, the biggest cause of suffering. Both the peasants and lower sub-caste samurai were affected by their actions. Agriculture and food production experienced a crisis due to a failed harvest in 1833 and 1836 and the government demanded high tax rates from ordinary citizens. This crisis was very rare in the ever-prosperous Kansai and unrest spread into the big cities. The population protested against the sharp increase in rice prices and began engaging in  uchikowashi  (destroying the residences of those deemed to be complicit in inflation) as an act of resistance. This led to the destruction of a large part of Ōsaka. The unrest alarmed the Tokugawa shogunate and simultaneously Ōshio, who at that moment was employed as a Yoriki. In 1837 Ōshio sought help from the administrators and wealthy merchants of Ōsaka, but his efforts were fruitless. There was no movement at the time for the rights of ordinary citizens, so Ōshio ensured that the anger of the population was channeled to an organized uprising. Despite the fact that he had a lot of influence and was a member of the elite of Japan, he helped them fight the government's corruption. The failed harvest, which caused famine and high rice prices, together with exacerbating fiscal problems and problems with foreign countries (opium wars), is called the Tenpō Crisis (1830-1844). This was the direct reason for the uprising led by Ōshio Heihachirō.

Resistance 

Ōshio and his allies were forced to start the rebellion earlier than planned because a traitor informant had informed the authorities. On February 19, 1837, Ōshio set fire to his house in Ōsaka as a signal for his followers to start the rebellion before the Bakufu troops had the chance to suppress them. He ordered the farmers to burn tax archives and ordered the poor to rob the warehouses of the rich and redistribute the rice among the hungry population. Although planned in detail, the uprising was a fiasco. The insurgents were poorly trained in the use of weapons and combat techniques, but also the bakufu troops were inadequate. Eventually, the government soldiers were able to suppress the uprising and Ōshio, together with his son, fled to the mountains. He was followed, but lit his shelter on fire before the bakufu troops could arrest him. He burned himself and his son alive.

Effects 

One can conclude that this bold action was a failure. More than 3,000 houses burned and 30,000 to 40,000 koku rice were destroyed. The majority of his followers committed suicide and from the 29 insurgents who were captured, only five survived the interrogations. The survivors were salted so their bodies could be crucified. It is unclear what Ōshio's political program and strategy was. It is possible that he was motivated to help the population as per his Confucian ideology. A positive outcome was that it sparked public interest in international politics.

Footnotes

Sources 
 Cullen, L. M. (2003) A history of Japan, 1582–1941. Cambridge: Cambridge.
 Jansen, M. B. (2000) The making of modern Japan. Cambridge: Cambridge.

External links 
 Fred G. Notehelfer, Shinto and Kokugaku, article by Encyclopædia Britannica
 Vincent Shen, Wisdom in China and the West, online reference work "Chinese Philosophical studies"
 Louis G. Perez, Japan at war, online reference work
 I. J. Meyer, The path of the righteous man, podcast "History of Japan"
 H. G. Blocker, Japanese philosophy, online reference work

Samurai
1793 births
1837 deaths
19th-century Japanese philosophers
19th-century Japanese writers
Japanese Confucianists
Japanese revolutionaries
Japanese writers of the Edo period